GameFly is a privately held American online video game rental subscription service that specializes in providing games for Nintendo, Sony and Microsoft systems starting from the sixth generation onwards.

The business model of GameFly is similar to the DVD-by-mail subscription service Netflix and Blockbuster online. In 2009 GameFly sued the U.S. Postal Service alleging the favoring of Netflix and Blockbuster by sorting their DVDs at no charge. GameFly sends games to subscribers for a monthly fee. Over 8,000 titles are available.

In May 2018, Electronic Arts announced that they acquired cloud gaming technology assets and personnel from GameFly (including its Israeli outpost). GameFly is currently owned by the same ownership group as Alliance Entertainment and is operated as a stand-alone company.

History
In May 2002, Sean Spector and Jung Suh partnered with founding CEO Toby Lenk to start GameFly. GameFly later received venture capital funding from Sequoia Capital. In February 2009, GameFly acquired the gaming news and community site Shacknews, along with its download and streaming video sites.  It was reported in February 2011 that GameFly had acquired MobyGames.  Despite filing plans in February 2010 for an initial public offering, GameFly remains a privately owned company as of 2017. GameFly shut down the streaming service on August 31, 2018.

Purchase of Direct2Drive 
In 2011, Gamefly announced that they had acquired Direct2Drive, an online distribution service previously owned by IGN. Direct2Drive later merged with GameFly; subscribers that had both D2D and GameFly accounts were migrated to a single account.

Shortly after the merger, GameFly introduced a new "GameFly Client", which combined the services previously offered by Direct2Drive and GameFly individually; the client came out of beta on November 8, 2012, and allowed direct download and installation of PC games, as well as the rental of games without visiting the GameFly website itself.

As of April 2014, GameFly has since sold Direct2Drive to AtGames.

References

External links

American companies established in 2002
Companies based in Santa Monica, California
Electronic Arts
Online retailers of the United States
Online-only retailers of video games
Retail companies established in 2002
Video rental services
Privately held companies based in California
Subscription video game services
2002 establishments in California